Yukimi Moriyama (born 9 August 1996) is a Japanese swimmer. She competed in the women's 800 metre freestyle event at the 2018 FINA World Swimming Championships (25 m), in Hangzhou, China. In 2018, she also competed in the women's 800 metre freestyle and 1500 metre freestyle events at the 2018 Asian Games held in Jakarta, Indonesia.

At the 2014 Junior Pan Pacific Swimming Championships, as part of the open water swimming competition contested at Ulua Beach in Hawaii, United States, Moriyama won the gold medal in the 10 kilometre open water marathon with a time of 2:00:00.0, finishing over three full minutes ahead of the silver medalist from Australia.

References

External links
 

1996 births
Living people
Japanese female freestyle swimmers
Place of birth missing (living people)
Swimmers at the 2018 Asian Games
Asian Games competitors for Japan